The Matica srpska (Matica srpska) is the oldest Serbian language independent, non-profit, non-governmental and cultural-scientific Serbian national institution. It was founded on June 1, 1826 in Pest (today a part of Budapest) by the Serbian habsburg legislator Jovan Hadžić and other prominent members of the Serbian Revolution and National Revival. The Matica was moved to Novi Sad in 1864. It is the oldest matica in the world.

The main goals are to restore and promote Serbian national and cultural identity in the fields of art, science, spiritual creativity, economy and public life as well as to care for social development of Serbia. The literary and cultural society played a huge role in the flourishing of science and culture of the Serbs of Vojvodina, Serbia.

The need for national homogenization, enlightenment, as well as the publication of Serbian books, were the main reasons for the formation of such a Society. The immediate reason for founding Matica Srpska was the need to take over the Serbian Chronicle (later the Chronicle of Matica Srpska), the oldest Serbian literary magazine and then the only Serbian newspaper, which was threatened with extinction.

The Matica Srpska Publishing Center has regular publishing activities, including several projects of national importance, such as Ten Centuries of Serbian Literature (Десет векова српске књижевности).

Today, in the Palace of Matica srpska in Novi sad more than hundred book presentations, scientific symposia, round table discussions, professional and scientific lectures and concerts of classical music are being organized annually. Matica Srpska is also one of the largest and most important book and magazine publishers in Serbia.

Matica Srpska operates on the territory of Croatia, Bosnia and Herzegovina (Republika Srpska) as Association of Members of Matica Srpska in Republika Srpska, as well in Montenegro as Association of members of Matica Srpska in Montenegro. In addition, Matica Srpska operates in Vienna.

Etymology
The name Matica is  best translated as "The Centre", although the term matica in this context translates as "queen bee" or "parent body", and the adjective srpska refers to Serbia and/or Serbs. According to this, the name of Matica srpska can be literally translated into English as "Parent body of the Serbs".

History

Of all the Slavic maticas, Matica Srpska was the first to be established in the Habsburg Empire at the time of a Serb national and cultural awakening.

During the national awakening from the end of the 18th and the beginning of the 19th century, the Serbs of the Serbian Vojvodina played a significant role as, though "by force of historical circumstance, they formed at this period the core of Serb intellectual life". One of the most important tasks facing the Serbs, in advancing cultural-national rebirth, was the solution of the literary language problem, and, as a result of the first fifty years of the 19th century, saw the Vojvodina Serbs engaged in an intense debate about the kind of literary language that their newly revitalized, emerging nation should adopt.

For the Slavic people, as well as the non-Slavs, under the Habsburg Empire, the Matica foundation fomented the development of national cultures. Indeed, the oldest is Matica srpska founded in 1826 in Pest by Jovan Hadžić and his business backers, Josif Milovuk (1793–1850), Jovan Demetrović (1778–1830), Gavrilo Bozitovac (1789–1856), Andrej Rozmirović, Petar Rajić and Djordje Stanković (1782–1853) at the same time as the Hungarian Academy was being built. Jovan Hadžić prepared its by-laws, secured its charter, and also served as its first president while Josif Milovuk served as its first secretary. In addition to books, it published the journal Serbski letopis, founded two years earlier by Georgije Magarašević, Pavel Jozef Šafárik, and Lukijan Mušicki in Novi Sad, where Magarašević was professor and Šafárik the director of Novi Sad's Serbian Gymnasium.

The story of the Matica Srpska actually began in 1824, when the Austrian authorities permitted writer Georgije Magarašević, a professor at a gymnasium in the town of Novi Sad, to publish a literary and scholarly journal entitled "Serbski letopis" ("Serbian Annals"). Magarašević had little financial backing but soon found benefactors who supported his efforts. In time, the writers and editors of the publication developed into a learned society, successfully overcoming pressures applied by mistrustful Austrian officials as well as later financial difficulties. With varying degrees of success but with great perseverance, it has continued to support and guide Serb intellectual endeavor, first, as a part of the Habsburg Empire and much later as part of the Kingdom of Serbs, Croats, and Slovenes.

In 1838, a wealthy Serb landowner, Sava Tekelija, left the Matica a legacy to support Serbian students at the University of Pest and a college named after him, Tekelijanum (Tokolyanum in Hungarian). The Hungarian authorities were suspicious of the Matica and even suspended its activities in 1835–1836 for alleged pan-Slavism, but they resisted Serb efforts to move the institution to Novi Sad. In 1863 the move was nevertheless accomplished, and the Matica, as well as the journal Letopis, is flourishing there today.

The Matica Srpska Society was one of the initiators of the Novi Sad agreement on the Serbo-Croatian language (1954), and it led the action for making the unique orthography of the language (1960). They compiled The Vocabulary of Serbian Standard Literary Language in six volumes (1967–76).

In Yugoslavia, Matica Srpska was one half of a joint project (with Matica hrvatska) to develop a common Serbo-Croatian dictionary. Mid-way through the project (1967), Matica hrvatska, by the declaration of principles about the Croatian language, withdrew, and Matica srpska was left to finish the dictionary on her own.

Matica Srpska has been an example to many Slavic nations. Based on this model the following institutions were established: Czech Matica in 1831, Illyrian Matica in 1842 (in 1874 renamed to Matica hrvatska); Matica Lužičkosrpska in 1847, Halych-Russian Matica in Lviv in 1848; Moravian Matica in 1849; Matica Dalmatinska in Zadar in 1861; Slovak Matica in 1863; Slovenian Matica in 1864; Matica Opava in 1877; Matica in the Teschen Princedom in 1898. (from which Silesian Matica came to be in 1968); Polish Matica in Lviv (1882); Educational Matica in the Teschen Princedom in 1885; Educational Matica in Warsaw in 1905; Bulgarian Matica in Constantinople in 1909 and the new Bulgarian Matica in 1989.

Activities and library
Matica Srpska publishes the Letopis Matice srpske magazine, which is one of the oldest in the world, being continuously published since 1824.

The institution has already published numerous books by authors such as Jovan Sterija Popović since its inception.

The Law of the Matica Srpska Society (1986) regulates matters of endowment and legacy, given by the national benefactors, and how money is spent for various cultural and educational purposes.

The Matica Srpska has a library with over 3,500,000 books and other documents.

Presidents

Editors of Letopis Matice srpske

 Georgije Magarašević (1824–1830)
 Jovan Hadžić (1830–1831),
 Pavle Stamatović (1831–1832),
 Teodor Pavlović (1832–1841),
 Jovan Subotić (1841–1848),
 Sima Filipović (1848),
 Jovan Subotić (1850–1853),
 Jakov Ignjatović (1854–1856),
 Jovan Mladenović-Subota (1856–1857),
 Jovan Đorđević (1857–1859),
 Antonije Hadžić (1859–1871),
 Jovan Bošković (1871–1875),
 Antonije Hadžić (1876–1895),
 Milan Savić (1896–1911),
 Tihomir Ostojić (1912–1914),
 Vasa Stajić (1921),
 Kamenko Subotić (1922–1923),
 Marko Maletin (1923–1929),
 Stevan Ćirić (1929),
 Svetislav Banica (1929),
 Radivoje Vrhovac (1930),
 Todor Manojlović (1931),
 Žarko Vasiljević (1932),
 Nikola Milutinović (1933–1935),
 Vasa Stajić (1936), pedagogue
 Nikola Milutinović (1936–1941),
 Živan Milisavac (1946–1957),
 Mladen Leskovac (1958–1964),
 Boško Petrović (1964–1969),
 Aleksandar Tišma (1969–1973), novelist
 Dimitrije Vučenov (1974–1979),
 Momčilo Milankov (1979),
 Boško Ivkov (1980–1991),
 Slavko Gordić (1992–2008),
 Ivan Negrišorac (2008–present) is the pen name of poet Dragan Stanić

References

External links
Matica srpska official website

 http://www.bms.ns.ac.rs/bmseng101a.htm

 
Srpska, Matica
Serbs of Vojvodina
Habsburg Serbs
Language regulators
Culture of Vojvodina
Serbian culture
Culture in Novi Sad
History of Budapest
Organizations established in 1826
Libraries in Serbia
Serbian cultural organizations
Serb organizations
1826 establishments in the Austrian Empire
Research in Serbia